Frank Lockhart may refer to:

Frank Lockhart (diplomat) (1881–1949), American diplomat
Frank Lockhart (racing driver) (1903–1928), American racing driver